This list of tallest buildings in Durban ranks completed buildings by height in the city of Durban which is the third most populous city in South Africa after Johannesburg and Cape Town and the largest city in the South African province of KwaZulu-Natal.

Tallest buildings
This includes spires and architectural details.

Skyscrapers number by cities
This table shows South African cities with at least one skyscraper over 100 metres in height, completed.

References

Tallest, Durban
Buildings and structures in Durban